Government General Degree College, Khumulwng, established in 2007, is a general degree college in Khumulwng, Tripura. It offers undergraduate courses in arts and sciences. It is affiliated to  Tripura University.

Departments

Science
Information Technology

Arts
Bengali
English
Kokborok
Sanskrit
Political Science
Philosophy
Education

Accreditation
The college is recognized by the University Grants Commission (UGC).

See also
Education in India
Education in Tripura
Tripura University
Literacy in India
List of institutions of higher education in Tripura

References

External links
http://khumulwngcollege.in/

Colleges affiliated to Tripura University
Educational institutions established in 2007
Universities and colleges in Tripura
2007 establishments in Tripura
Colleges in Tripura